North New York may refer to:

 North Country, New York, a region of upstate New York
 North New York, Bronx, a former neighborhood of the Bronx, New York City